is a Japanese tokusatsu television series. It is the second installment in the popular Kamen Rider Series, and the direct sequel to the original Kamen Rider. It was a joint collaboration between Ishimori Productions and Toei, and was shown on Mainichi Broadcasting System and NET from February 17, 1973, to February 9, 1974.

Every episode of Kamen Rider V3 begins with the following opening narration: "Kamen Rider V3, Shiro Kazami, is an altered human. Mortally wounded by Destron, he is rebuilt by Kamen Riders 1 and 2, reborn as Kamen Rider V3."

Plot
Starting after the events of the original series student of Takeshi, Shiro Kazami witnesses a murder by Destron, a new organization created from Gel-Shocker by its previously thought deceased leader. They attempt to kill Shiro and later kill his family. With this Shiro begs Takeshi and Hayato to turn him into a Kamen Rider. After turning Shiro into Kamen Rider V3 the first two riders sacrifice themselves to save Tokyo. Shiro then must fight Destron in Japan with the help of Tobei, the Kamen Rider Kid Corps, and later the first two riders having survived and left to fight Destron in other countries. Towards the end of his war Shiro is joined by ex-Destron scientist, Joji Yuki a.k.a. the Riderman. Eventually, Joji sacrificed himself to save Japan and thus Shiro named him Kamen Rider #4. During the final battle Shiro stopped Destron’s leader and the organization as a whole saving the world from its rein of terror. But their leader still survived, meaning someday more of his forces could appear to enact his will.

Characters

Kamen Riders
 ("V3" or "Rider V3", for short) is a cyborg who fights Destron. When he encounters a Destron monster, he intones, Henshin... V3!, and transforms into Kamen Rider V3. He is host to 26 special powers that he uses to fight Destron; V3 doesn't know what all of his special powers are, but most of them are revealed during the course of the series. Among his powers are Bulletproof Muscles, the V3 Hopper (a device that allows him to track enemies) and the V3 Reverse Kick. Others, including the V3 Thunder (one of his most powerful), were revealed in stage shows, manga and magazines of the time. His nuclear-powered motorcycle is named "Hurricane"; it also has a variety of special abilities.
: A Destron scientist who is betrayed by Marshal Yoroi. His right arm is burnt off and replaced by a special mechanical one, which gives him special powers. Initially, he distrusts V3, but eventually becomes an ally. V3 declares him to be "Kamen Rider Number Four" in tribute, after sacrificing his life to protect Tokyo from destruction. Riderman appears in some of the sequels. How he survived is not fully explained in the TV show, but it is explained in detail in the Kamen Rider Spirits manga.

Allies
: Shiro's mentor and advisor. This character appeared in the original Kamen Rider and also appeared in the following three series.
: A young woman who has a crush on Shiro. Shiro is aware of her crush, but refuses to let her get close to him, to protect her, because he lives such a dangerous life. Despite this, she assists Shiro, often watching the communications station, and eventually becomes a close friend to Shiro. She often gets into dangerous situations, requiring V3 to rescue her.
: Junko's kid brother and a member of the Boys' Kamen Rider Squad. He sometimes acts as Shiro's liaison with the Boys' Kamen Rider members.
: Also known as The Kamen Rider Scouts. They are young boys who assist Kamen Rider V3. They have members throughout Japan. They wear medallions which are shaped like the head of Kamen Rider V3. The medallions contain radios which allow them to report suspicious activity to Kamen Rider headquarters.
: A Destron Hunter, from Interpol, who helps V3 for a few episodes. He is Destron Hunter no. 5 and is the last surviving Destron hunter.

Destron
 is an international organization bent on conquering the world with terrorist acts, Destron was formed under the lead of the mysterious Great Leader by surviving members of Gelshocker. Although Destron had branches in every country and sought to dominate the entire planet, its main headquarters was in Japan which Destron focused its attention on. Initially the monster of the Mechanical Army followed the orders of the unseen Destron Leader without any direct supervision, but after repeated failures of the monsters the Destron Leader summoned Doctor G from Destron's German Division to take charge of the day-to-day operations of Destron's Japanese Division. Destron used the scorpion as its symbol but had no scorpion-like monsters. Destron is the only Showa villainous organization in the franchise to appear in the movie OOO, Den-O, All Riders: Let's Go Kamen Riders although several of its monsters make appearances; this is most likely due to the organization being formed from Shocker remnants, therefore making its construction unnecessary. Their name is also reused as the Japanese name of the Decepticon faction from the Transformers franchise.

  - Another form of the Shocker Leader from the original series, originally thought to have died in a failed kamikaze attack against Kamen Riders One and Two. In the earliest episodes he led directly; later he let one of his generals lead for him. His cyborgs are patterned after a combination of a manmade object and an animal (such as Camera Mosquito or Bazooka Turtle). In the last few episodes, he appeared in person for brief periods of time, but he wore a robe with a hood which hid all of his features. When his robe was pulled, a man with his head covered by white bandages and a smiling mask was revealed, but he quickly escaped. In the final episode, he was revealed to be a monstrous skeleton with a living heart, calling himself God of Death. V3 destroyed the monster's heart, apparently killing him, just to hear his voice again, from a tape player inside the skeleton's head. He congratulates V3 for finding his true form but reveals that V3 would die alongside himself. Immediately afterwards, the Destron headquarters self-destructed, but V3 escaped.
  /  - Destron's first general in knight armor from Germany in charge of Japan. He wields a battle axe, a short sword, and a knife. In the comics, his scorpion-shaped helmet could transform into a deadly scorpion, but this did not happen on TV. Most of his monsters are cyborgs that are the same type as Destron Leader's cyborgs. He tends to pronounce his enemy's name as "Kamen Riiiiider V3!". After numerous failures, Doctor G summoned the spirits of his dead, evil warriors to transform him into Kani Laser for his final battle with Kamen Rider V3. Despite putting up a heroic battle, he was destroyed by V3's V3 Tailspin Return Kick.
  /  - The leopard-skin wearing witch doctor from Africa, second general of Destron, and leader of the Kiba Clan. He wields a spear which could fire explosive charges. His powers are magical in origin. The monsters in his Kiba Clan are mutated forms of wild animals with fangs or tusks that are empowered through blood sacrifices of innocent victims by Baron Kiba. After his Kiba Clan was wiped out by Kamen Rider V3, Baron Kiba later called on the spirits of Doovoo to give him the power to transform into the Vampiric Mammoth so that he could take revenge on V3 in his final battle. He was destroyed by V3's V3 Revolving Triple Kick.
  /  - The robe-wearing general from Tibet. The monsters in his Wing Unit are all mutated versions of flying animals with the exception of one plantlike monster. He wields a bird-headed spiked staff. Archbishop Tsubasa later takes on his true form called Zombie Bat in his final battle with Kamen Rider V3. He was destroyed by V3's V3 Mach Kick. Marshal Yoroi later revived Archbishop Tsubasa's Zombie Bat form in order to ambush Kamen Rider V3. He was defeated by V3 with several punches.
  /  - Destron's final general in plated armor who comes from Mongolia. Most of his monsters in his Armored Division are mutated versions of armored animals. He wields an oversized spiked mace in one hand and practices dark magic. Pronounces Destron as "Deeestron". He frames scientist Joji Yuki for treason, fearing his position in Destron is in jeopardy, creating a rival in Riderman. Marshal Yoroi became Zariganna in his final battle against Kamen Rider V3. After being defeated by Kamen Rider V3 and despite surviving the encounter, Zariganna was destroyed by the Destron Leader for failing. In Kamen Rider Spirits, he is restored in a new Crab Inhumanoid body and seeks to eliminate his former rival Riderman. He was ultimately destroyed by Riderman's Machine Gun Arm.

Special guest characters from Kamen Rider
Takeshi Hongo/Kamen Rider 1
Hayato Ichimonji/Kamen Rider 2
Colonel Zol
Doctor Death
Ambassador Hell
General Black

Episodes 
  (Original Airdate: February 17, 1973)
  (Original Airdate: February 24, 1973)
  (Original Airdate: March 3, 1973)
  (Original Airdate: March 10, 1973)
  (Original Airdate: March 17, 1973)
  (Original Airdate: March 24, 1973)
  (Original Airdate: March 31, 1973)
  (Original Airdate: April 7, 1973)
  (Original Airdate: April 14, 1973)
  (Original Airdate: April 21, 1973)
  (Original Airdate: April 28, 1973)
  (Original Airdate: May 5, 1973)
  (Original Airdate: May 12, 1973)
  (Original Airdate: May 19, 1973)
  (Original Airdate: May 26, 1973)
  (Original Airdate: June 2, 1973)
  (Original Airdate: June 9, 1973)
  (Original Airdate: June 16, 1973)
  (Original Airdate: June 23, 1973)
  (Original Airdate: June 30, 1973)
  (Original Airdate: July 7, 1973)
  (Original Airdate: July 14, 1973)
  (Original Airdate: July 21, 1973)
  (Original Airdate: July 28, 1973)
  (Original Airdate: August 4, 1973)
  (Original Airdate: August 11, 1973)
  (Original Airdate: August 18, 1973)
  (Original Airdate: August 25, 1973)
  (Original Airdate: September 1, 1973)
  (Original Airdate: September 8, 1973)
  (Original Airdate: September 15, 1973)
  (Original Airdate: September 22, 1973)
  (Original Airdate: September 29, 1973)
  (Original Airdate: October 6, 1973)
  (Original Airdate: October 13, 1973)
  (Original Airdate: October 20, 1973)
  (Original Airdate: October 27, 1973)
  (Original Airdate: November 3, 1973)
  (Original Airdate: November 10, 1973)
  (Original Airdate: November 17, 1973)
  (Original Airdate: November 24, 1973)
  (Original Airdate: December 1, 1973)
  (Original Airdate: December 8, 1973)
  (Original Airdate: December 15, 1973)
  (Original Airdate: December 22, 1973)
  (Original Airdate: December 29, 1973)
  (Original Airdate: January 5, 1974)
  (Original Airdate: January 12, 1974)
  (Original Airdate: January 19, 1974)
  (Original Airdate: January 26, 1974)
  (Original Airdate: February 2, 1974)
  (Original Airdate: February 9, 1974)

Movies
1973: Kamen Rider V3: A movie version of episode 2.

During a battle against Destron's forces, Shiro Kazami helps a priest who has been attacked by the evil organization's monster Hasami-Jaguar. Little does he know that the church where the priest resides is a front for a Destron hideout. After finding out the organization's latest motive, Kamen Rider V3, along with the Double Riders, must stop Destron from detonating a nuclear bomb in Tokyo.

1973: Kamen Rider V3 vs. Destron

A physicist named Tetsuo Okita discovers a new mineral called "satanum", which is more powerful than uranium and emits destructive effects to anyone exposed to it. However, Destron abducts Okita in hopes of finding the source of satanum and collecting more of it to expedite their run for global domination. Kamen Rider V3 must act fast in rescuing Professor Okita and preventing Destron from collecting more of the deadly mineral.

S.I.C. Hero Saga
Published in Monthly Hobby Japan magazine from May to August 2003, the S.I.C. Hero Saga story Masked Rider V3 & Riderman: Riderman Another After featured an alternate history of Riderman's creation.

Chapter titles

Manga 

A manga adaptation was made by Mitsuru Sugaya during the run of the series.

Kamen Rider The Next
As of 2007, a reimagined Kamen Rider V3 appears in Kamen Rider The Next, a movie loosely based on the TV series, following the reboot of the franchise started with the 2005 movie Kamen Rider The First.

Cast
Hiroshi Miyauchi as Shiro Kazami
Akiji Kobayashi as Tōbei Tachibana
Hizuru Ono as Junko Tama
Hideki Kawaguchi as Shigeru Tama
Jōtarō Senba as Doktor G
Eiji Gō as Baron Kiba
Sachio Fujino as Archbishop Tsubasa
Bunya Nakamura as Marshal Yoroi
Ken Kawashima as Ken Sakuma
Gorō Naya as The Destron Leader (voice)
Shinji Nakae as Narrator

Songs
Opening theme

Lyrics: Shotaro Ishinomori
Composer: Shunsuke Kikuchi
Vocals: Hiroshi Miyauchi and 

Ending themes

Lyrics: 
Composer: Shunsuke Kikuchi
Vocals: Ichirou Mizuki and the 
Episodes: 1-42

Lyrics: 
Composer: Shunsuke Kikuchi
Vocals: Masato Shimon and the Columbia Yurikago-Kai
Episodes: 43-52

Home Video
Released on DVD in Hawaii by JN Productions/Generation Kikaida in 2008

V3
1973 Japanese television series debuts
1974 Japanese television series endings
Television series about revenge
TV Asahi original programming
1970s Japanese television series
Japanese horror fiction television series